Yiğit İncedemir (born 9 March 1985) is a Turkish footballer who plays as a defensive midfielder. He was also a youth international, earning caps at the Turkey U-15, U-18, and U-19 levels.

Club career
İncedemir began his amateur career with Güraltay in 1997. İzmirspor transferred him in 1999, before transferring him to Karşıyaka in 2003. He spent four years with the club before joining Adana Demirspor in 2007. Manisaspor signed him in 2008.
İncedemir made his senior debut for the Turkish national team after being chosen by Guus Hiddink to play against Netherlands. İncedemir came on as a substitute for Selçuk İnan on the 90th minute. and Turkey lost the game 1-0.

References

External links
 
 

1985 births
Living people
Turkish footballers
Turkey international footballers
Turkey youth international footballers
İzmirspor footballers
Karşıyaka S.K. footballers
Adana Demirspor footballers
Manisaspor footballers
Kardemir Karabükspor footballers
Sivasspor footballers
Fatih Karagümrük S.K. footballers
Süper Lig players
TFF First League players
TFF Second League players
Footballers from İzmir
Association football midfielders